Pseudospatha tanganyicensis a species of freshwater mussel, an aquatic bivalve mollusk in the family Unionidae, the river mussels. It is the only species in the genus Pseudospatha.

This species is endemic to Lake Tanganyika where found in Burundi, the Democratic Republic of the Congo, Tanzania, and Zambia. It is common and widespread in the lake.

Pseudospatha is one of three monotypic genera of freshwater mussel that are endemic to Lake Tanganyika, the others being Brazzaea and Grandidieria.

References

Unionidae
Molluscs described in 1880
Taxonomy articles created by Polbot
Bivalve genera
Monotypic mollusc genera
Fauna of Lake Tanganyika